Cyril Rickards was a rugby union international who represented England in 1873.

Early life
Cyril Rickards was born on 11 January 1854 in Jeypore, the son of Colonel Rickards. Along with his brother, Alan William Low Rickards, he attended Rugby School.

Rugby union career
Rickards made his only international appearance on 3 March 1873 at Hamilton Crescent, Glasgow for England against Scotland.

Career
Rickards initially had a military career, spending some time at the Royal Artillery barracks, Woolwich, Ratcliff gardens, Southsea, and Bengal. After retiring as a major in the army he moved to West Brighton.

References

1854 births
1920 deaths
English rugby union players
England international rugby union players
Rugby union forwards